Buckhead Church is a nondenominational Christian church in the Buckhead district of Atlanta, Georgia. Buckhead Church is one of eight locations of North Point Ministries. Andy Stanley is the senior pastor of North Point Ministries, and Joel Thomas is the lead pastor of Buckhead Church.

History

Buckhead Church was founded on April 29, 2001 as a biweekly meeting called Buckhead Fellowship. Andy Stanley advised the founders and was the first guest speaker. The church officially became affiliated with North Point Ministries in August 2001.

The church originally met in the building of Buckhead Baptist Church on Sunday evenings. In 2002, the church moved to the Doubletree Hotel in Buckhead.
On Easter 2003, the church moved to a building in Sandy Springs formerly occupied by a Harris Teeter grocery store.

From the fall of 2006 through the spring of 2007, Buckhead Church opened a second temporary campus in a movie theater at Atlantic Station. This was known as the "Midtown Gathering."

The church held its first services at its current location at Tower Place on May 6, 2007. The  building houses an auditorium that holds 3,000 seats.

References

External links
 

Evangelical megachurches in the United States
Megachurches in Georgia
Evangelical churches in Georgia (U.S. state)
Churches in Atlanta
Christian organizations established in 2001
21st-century Protestant churches
2001 establishments in Georgia (U.S. state)
21st-century churches in the United States